400 East Ohio Street (originally called Streeterville 400 and later The Bancroft) is a 505 ft (154 m) tall skyscraper in Chicago, Illinois. It was completed in 1983 and has 50 floors. Gordon & Levin designed the building, which is the 85th tallest in Chicago.

See also
List of tallest buildings in Chicago

References

Skyscraperpage
Chicago Architecture

Residential skyscrapers in Chicago
Residential buildings completed in 1983
Streeterville, Chicago
1983 establishments in Illinois